Eastern culture, also known as Eastern civilization and historically as Oriental culture, is an umbrella term for various cultural heritages of social norms, ethical values, traditional customs, belief systems, political systems, artifacts and technologies of the Eastern world. 

While there is no singular and catch-all "Eastern culture", there are subgroups within it, such as countries within East Asia, Southeast Asia, or South Asia, as well as syncretism within these regions. These include the spread of Eastern religions such as Buddhism or Hinduism, the usage of Chinese characters or Brahmic scripts, language families, the fusion of cuisines, and traditions, among others.

Terminology 

The East, as a geographical area, is unclear and undefined. More often, the ideology of a state's inhabitants is what will be used to categorize it as an Eastern society. There is some disagreement about what nations should or should not be included in the category and at what times. Many parts of the Eastern Roman (Byzantine) Empire are considered to be distinct from the West and therefore labelled as eastern by most scholars. The Byzantine Empire was primarily influenced by Eastern practices due to its proximity and cultural similarity to Iran and Arabia, thus lacking features seen as "Western". Both Eastern and Western European authors have often perceived Byzantium as a body of religious, political, and philosophical ideas contrary to those of the West.

It is difficult to determine which individuals fit into which category, and the East–West contrast is sometimes criticized as relativistic and arbitrary. Globalism has spread Western ideas so widely that almost all modern cultures are, to some extent, influenced by aspects of Eastern culture. Stereotypical views of "the East" have been labeled Orientalism, paralleling Occidentalism—the term for the 19th-century stereotyped views of "the West".

As Europeans discovered the wider world, old concepts adapted. The area that had formerly been considered the Orient ("the East") became the Near East as the interests of the European powers interfered with Meiji Japan and Qing China for the first time in the 19th century. Thus, the Sino-Japanese War in 1894–1895 occurred in the Far East while the troubles surrounding the decline of the Ottoman Empire simultaneously occurred in the Near East. The term Middle East in the mid-19th century included the territory east of the Ottoman Empire, but West of China—Greater Persia and Greater India—is now used synonymously with "Near East" in most languages.

Traditions 

While there is no singular Eastern culture of the Eastern world, there are subgroups within it, such as countries within East Asia, Southeast Asia, or South Asia, as well as syncretism within these regions. These include the spread of Eastern religions such as Buddhism or Hinduism, the usage of Chinese characters or Brahmic scripts, language families, the fusion of cuisines, and traditions, among others. Eastern culture has developed many themes and traditions. Some important ones are listed below:

Religion 
 Abrahamic religions (see also religion in the Middle East) 
 Christianity – the majority of the modern world adheres to this faith, although it is no longer widely practiced in its native continent of Asia. Since the faith spread to Europe in antiquity, the notion of "Europe" and the "Western world" has been intimately connected with the concept of "Christianity and the Christian world". Many even attribute Christianity for being the link that created a unified European identity. In Asia, Cyprus, Georgia, Armenia, Russia, the Philippines and East Timor are the only Christian-majority countries, though there are also minority Christian populations in the Levant, Anatolia, Fars, and Kerala that have preserved their ancient beliefs, adhering to Syriac Christianity (i.e. Assyrian and Maronite people), an Eastern Christian sect. Significant Christian communities are also found in Central Asia, China, Hong Kong, India, Indonesia, Japan, Macau, Malaysia, South Korea, Singapore, Taiwan and Vietnam. 
 Islam – the majority of the world's Muslim population has always lived in Asia, due to Islam spreading and becoming the dominant religion of Western Asia, Central Asia and Southeast Asia.
 Judaism – the ancient religion of the Israelites or Hebrews of the Fertile Crescent, who lived in what is now Israel, Palestine, Jordan, Syria, and Lebanon. They eventually evolved into the Ashkenazi, Sephardic, and Mizrahi Jews and Samaritans of today.
 Druze faith – an esoteric ethnoreligious group that resides primarily in Syria, Lebanon, Israel and Jordan.
 Zoroastrianism – the ancient monotheistic state religion of Sassanid Iran.
 Eastern religions (see also Eastern philosophy) 
 Indian religions
 Hinduism – an ancient faith that evolved from the Vedic religion of North India.
 Buddhism – an ancient religion and philosophical tradition based on a series of original teachings attributed to Gautama Buddha.
 Jainism – an ancient religion that traces its spiritual ideas and history through the succession of twenty-four Tirthankaras (supreme preachers of Dharma), the last of whom was Mahāvīra. 
 Sikhism – a relatively new religion that developed in the warring plains of 15th-century Punjab in an atmosphere of ideological war between Islam and Hinduism. Its followers retain spiritual as well as martial qualities.
 Taoic religions (a.k.a. East Asian religions)
 Chinese folk religion – a general term covering a range of traditional religious practices of Han Chinese, including the Chinese diaspora.
 Confucianism – a system of thought and behavior originating in ancient China that developed from what was later called the Hundred Schools of Thought from the teachings of the Chinese philosopher Confucius.
 Taoism – an ancient Chinese school of philosophical thought and religion that emphasizes living in harmony with the Tao. The Tao Te Ching, a book containing teachings attributed to Laozi, together with the later writings of Zhuangzi, are both widely considered the keystone works of Taoism.
 Shinto – an ancient religion that originated in Japan. Its practitioners often regard it as Japan's indigenous religion and as a nature religion.
 Korean shamanism – an animistic ethnic religion of Korea dating back to prehistory and consists of the worship of gods and ancestors as well as nature spirits.
 Manchu shamanism – an animistic and polytheistic religion practiced by most of the Manchu people, believing in several gods and spirits, led by a universal sky god who is the source of all life and creation.
 Tengrism – an ancient ethnic and state Turko-Mongolic religion originating in the Eurasian steppes, based on folk shamanism, animism and generally centered around the titular sky god Tengri.
 Mongolian shamanism – the animistic and shamanic ethnic religion that has been practiced in Mongolia and its surrounding areas (including Buryatia and Inner Mongolia) at least since the age of recorded history.
 Shamanism in Siberia – religio-cultural practices of shamanism followed by a large minority of people in Siberia, and regarded by some researchers as the heartland of shamanism.

Cinema 

 Central Asian cinema
 Kazakh cinema
 Kyrgyz cinema
 Tajik cinema
 Turkmen cinema
 Uzbek cinema
 East Asian cinema
 Chinese cinema
 Hong Kong cinema
 Japanese cinema
 Korean cinema
 North Korean cinema
 South Korean cinema
 Mongolian cinema
 Taiwanese cinema
 North Asian cinema
 Russian cinema
 South Asian cinema
 Afghan cinema
 Bangladeshi cinema
 Bhutanese cinema
 Indian cinema
 Assamese cinema
 Bengali cinema
 Bhojpuri cinema
 Chhattisgarhi cinema
 Deccani cinema
 Dogri cinema
 Gujarati cinema
 Haryanvi cinema
 Hindi cinema
 Kannada cinema
 Kashmiri cinema
 Konkani cinema
 Malayalam cinema
 Meitei cinema
 Marathi cinema
 Oriya cinema
 Punjabi cinema
 Rajasthani cinema
 Sanskrit cinema
 Tamil cinema
 Telugu cinema
 Tulu cinema
 Pakistani cinema
 Lollywood
 Nepali cinema
 Sri Lankan cinema
 Southeast Asian cinema
 Cambodian cinema
 Burmese cinema
 Filipino cinema
 Indonesian cinema
 Laotian cinema
 Malaysian cinema
 Singaporean cinema
 Thai cinema
 Vietnamese cinema
 Western Asian cinema
 Arab cinema
 Armenian cinema
 Azerbaijani cinema
 Bahraini cinema
 Cypriot cinema
 Egyptian cinema
 Emirati cinema (UAE)
 Georgian cinema
 Iranian cinema
 Iraqi cinema
 Israeli cinema
 Jewish cinema
 Jordanian cinema
 Kuwaiti cinema
 Lebanese cinema
 Omani cinema
 Palestinian cinema
 Qatari cinema
 Saudi Arabian cinema
 Syrian cinema
 Turkish cinema
 Yemeni cinema

Cuisine 
 Western Asian cuisine
 Arab cuisine
 Armenian cuisine
 Assyrian cuisine
 Azerbaijani cuisine
 Bahraini cuisine
 Cypriot cuisine
 Eastern Arabian cuisine
 Egyptian cuisine
 Emirati cuisine
 Georgian cuisine
 Iranian cuisine
 Caspian cuisine
 Iraqi cuisine
 Israeli cuisine
 Jordanian cuisine
 Kurdish cuisine
 Kuwaiti cuisine
 Lebanese cuisine
 Levantine cuisine
 Mizrahi Jewish cuisine
 Omani cuisine
 Ossetian cuisine
 Palestinian cuisine
 Qatari cuisine
 Saudi Arabian cuisine
 Syrian cuisine
 Syrian Jewish cuisine
 Turkish cuisine
 Yemeni cuisine
 South Asian cuisine
 Afghan cuisine
 Balochi cuisine
 Bangladeshi cuisine
 Bengali cuisine
 Bhutanese cuisine
 Cuisine of the Indian subcontinent
 Hazara cuisine
 Indian cuisine
 Anglo-Indian cuisine
 Arunachalese cuisine
 Assamese cuisine
 Bihari cuisine
 Bhojpuri cuisine
 Buddhist cuisine
 Goan cuisine
 Goan Catholic cuisine
 Gujarati cuisine
 Indian Chinese cuisine
 Indian fast food
 Jharkhandi cuisine
 Maharashtrian cuisine
 Malvani cuisine
 Manipuri cuisine
 Meghalayan cuisine
 Mizo cuisine
 Naga cuisine
 North Indian cuisine
 Kashmiri cuisine
 Rajasthani cuisine
 Cuisine of Uttar Pradesh
 Awadhi cuisine
 Cuisine of Uttarakhand
 Kumaoni cuisine
 Cuisine of Odisha
 Sikkimese cuisine
 South Indian cuisine
 Chettinad cuisine
 Karnataka cuisine
 Mangalorean cuisine
 Mangalorean Catholic cuisine
 Kerala cuisine
 Saraswat cuisine
 Telangana cuisine
 Hyderabadi cuisine
 Telugu cuisine
 Udupi cuisine
 Tripuri cuisine
 Maithil cuisine
 Maldivian cuisine
 Mughlai cuisine
 Nepalese cuisine
 Pakistani cuisine
 Lahori cuisine
 Pakistani Chinese cuisine
 Saraiki cuisine
 Sindhi cuisine
 Cuisine of Karachi
 Parsi cuisine
 Pashtun cuisine
 Punjabi cuisine
 Sri Lankan cuisine
 Tamil cuisine
 Central Asian cuisine
 Bukharan Jewish cuisine
 Kazakh cuisine
 Kyrgyz cuisine
 Tajik cuisine
 Turkmen cuisine
 Uzbek cuisine
 East Asian cuisine
 Chinese cuisine
 Anhui cuisine
 Beijing cuisine
 Cantonese cuisine
 Chinese aristocrat cuisine
 Chinese imperial cuisine
 Chinese Islamic cuisine
 Hakka cuisine
 Henan cuisine
 Hubei cuisine
 Hunan cuisine
 Guizhou cuisine
 Jiangsu cuisine
 Huaiyang cuisine
 Jiangxi cuisine
 Northeastern Chinese cuisine
 Manchu cuisine
 Jilin cuisine
 Liaoning cuisine
 Shaanxi cuisine
 Shandong cuisine
 Shanghai cuisine
 Shanxi cuisine
 Sichuan cuisine
 Teochew cuisine
 Tianjin cuisine
 Tibetan cuisine
 Uyghur cuisine
 Yunnan cuisine
 Zhejiang cuisine
 Hong Kong cuisine
 Japanese cuisine
 Ainu cuisine
 Japanese regional cuisine
 Okinawan cuisine
 Nagoya cuisine
 Korean cuisine
 Korean temple cuisine
 North Korean cuisine
 South Korean cuisine
 Macanese cuisine
 Mongolian cuisine
 Taiwanese cuisine
 Southeast Asian cuisine
 Bruneian cuisine
 Burmese cuisine
 Cambodian cuisine
 Christmas Island cuisine
 Cuisine of East Timor
 Eurasian cuisine of Singapore and Malaysia
 Filipino cuisine
 Indonesian cuisine
 Acehnese cuisine
 Arab Indonesian cuisine
 Balinese cuisine
 Banjar cuisine
 Batak cuisine
 Betawi cuisine
 Chinese Indonesian cuisine
 Indo cuisine
 Indonesian Indian cuisine
 Javanese cuisine
 Madurese cuisine
 Makassar cuisine
 Minahasan cuisine
 Padang cuisine
 Palembang cuisine
 Sundanese cuisine
 Lao cuisine
 Malay cuisine
 Malaysian cuisine
 Malaysian Chinese cuisine
 Malaysian Indian cuisine
 Sabahan cuisine
 Sarawakian cuisine
 Peranakan cuisine
 Singaporean cuisine
 Thai cuisine
 Vietnamese cuisine
 North Asian cuisine
 Russian cuisine
 Buryat cuisine
 Chukchi cuisine
 Cuisine of Commander Islands
 Sakha cuisine
 Yamal cuisine
 Yup'ik cuisine

Cultures 

Central Asian culture
Culture of Kazakhstan
Culture of Kyrgyzstan
Culture of Tajikistan
Culture of Turkmenistan
Culture of Uzbekistan
East Asian culture
Culture of China
Culture of Hong Kong
Culture of Macau
Culture of Mongolia
Culture of Japan
Culture of Korea
Culture of North Korea
Culture of South Korea
Culture of Taiwan
North Asian culture
Culture of Russia
South Asian culture
Culture of Afghanistan
Culture of Bangladesh
Culture of Bhutan
Culture of India
Culture of the Maldives
Culture of Nepal
Culture of Pakistan
Culture of Sri Lanka
Southeast Asian culture
Culture of Brunei
Culture of Cambodia
Culture of the Cocos (Keeling) Islands
Culture of East Timor
Culture of Indonesia
Culture of Malaysia
Culture of Myanmar
Culture of Laos
Culture of the Philippines
Culture of Singapore
Culture of Thailand
Culture of Vietnam
Western Asian culture
Arab culture
Culture of Abkhazia
Culture of Armenia
Culture of Artsakh
Assyrian culture
Culture of Azerbaijan
Culture of Bahrain
Culture of Eastern Arabia
Culture of Egypt
Culture of Iraq
Culture of Iran
Culture of Israel
Jewish culture
Culture of Jordan
Culture of Kuwait
Culture of Lebanon
Culture of Northern Cyprus
Culture of Palestine
Culture of Qatar
Culture of Saudi Arabia
Culture of Syria
Culture of Turkey
Culture of the United Arab Emirates
Culture of Yemen

Medicine 
 Oriental medicine
 Ayurveda
 Chinese medicine
 Kampo
 Traditional Korean medicine
 Traditional Filipino medicine
 Traditional Tibetan medicine
 Traditional Vietnamese medicine

Gallery

Family 
Families have a great importance in Eastern cultures. They teach their children about how the family is their protection and the major source of their identity. Parents expect loyalty from their children. Parents define the law and the children are expected to obey them. This is called filial piety, the respect for one's parents and elders, and it is a concept that originated in China as 孝 (xiao) from Confucian teachings. Children are expected to have self-control, thus making it hard for them to express emotions. They are also expected to show respect through their motions and the way they speak. Children are expected to look after their parents when they grow older. Sons are expected to stay home, while daughters eventually leave and live with their husband's family. In Chinese culture, children are occasionally expected to care for their elders (赡养), and in various diaspora communities one may find Chinese children living with their grandparents.

See also 
Eastern religions
Silk Road transmission of Buddhism

Notes

References

Bibliography 
 

 
Cultural anthropology
Sociological terminology